Sean Matthew Gregan (born 29 March 1974) is an English former professional footballer who played as a midfielder or centre back.

He played in the Premier League for West Bromwich Albion, and in the Football League with Preston North End and Darlington where he clocked up nearly 350 league appearances combined for both clubs. He also played in the Football League with Leeds United and Oldham Athletic before moving into non-League football with Fleetwood Town, Kendal Town and Darlington.

Club career

Early career
Gregan was born in Guisborough, North Riding of Yorkshire. He started his career with Darlington's youth system, before signing a professional contract on 20 January 1991. He played for them for five years before joining Preston North End. He was signed by Gary Peters on 29 November 1996 for £350,000. He captained Preston to the Second Division title.

West Bromwich Albion
Gregan signed for newly promoted Premier League club West Bromwich Albion on 3 August 2002 on a four-year contract for a fee of £2 million. Pundit Rodney Marsh thought the signing uninspired, and commented that it was "like putting lipstick on a pig". Gregan made his debut against Manchester United at Old Trafford on 17 August 2002. He scored his first goal for the club in a 1–0 home win over Southampton on 14 September 2002, after goalkeeper Paul Jones failed to hold on to Gregan's 40-yard shot. Despite being a regular in the team, Gregan was unable to prevent the club's relegation from the Premier League. In 2003–04, he was instrumental in captaining the team to promotion back to the Premier League at the first attempt, before joining Leeds United in September 2004.

Oldham Athletic
His lack of first team football in the 2006–07 season saw Gregan sent on loan on 8 November 2006 to Oldham Athletic of League One until 1 January 2007. He scored three days later on his debut, in a 4–3 win over Kettering Town in the FA Cup.

Gregan left Leeds on 5 January 2007 after reaching an agreement over the remainder of his contract, and signed a two-and-a-half-year contract at Oldham three days later. His performance in their 3–0 win away to Walsall on 22 September 2007 earned him a place in the League One Team of the Week.

He was released by Oldham manager Dave Penney after being deemed surplus to requirements on 12 May 2009. However, Penney had a change of heart after being impressed with the player's attitude and fitness levels, and he was soon brought back to the club on a one-year contract. He was later made captain of the team and remained a key feature in defence alongside Reuben Hazell.

Fleetwood Town
Oldham player-manager Paul Dickov stated in October 2010 that he would allow Gregan to leave the club, after he was unable to force his way into the team following an injury at the beginning of the 2010–11 season. Gregan joined Conference Premier club Fleetwood Town on 19 October 2010 on a three-month loan. He left Oldham on 6 January 2011 after having his contract terminated before signing for Fleetwood permanently. He was released at the end of 2010–11.

Kendal Town
Gregan signed for Northern Premier League Premier Division club Kendal Town on 10 August 2011. He made his debut three days later when starting a 3–0 home win over Worksop Town. He suffered a ruptured Achilles tendon on his second appearance on 21 August 2011 against Matlock Town.

Coaching career
Gregan returned to Darlington on 4 June 2012 as a player-coach, as part of new manager Martin Gray's backroom staff. He was appointed as joint manager of Darlington, alongside Brian Atkinson, on 1 October 2017 for the rest of the 2017–18 season after Gray left for the club's National League North rivals York City. However, the two left the club four days later without having taken charge of a match. With Atkinson also being a director of the Martin Gray Football Academy (MGFA), Football Association rules meant he was unable to hold the Darlington managerial position as the academy's owner was in charge at another club. Gregan turned down the offer of a six-month contract to take over as manager on his own, as he would have had to relinquish his own role the MGFA.

Gregan joined Gray at York in December 2017 as a part-time defensive coach. He took up the full-time position of assistant manager in July 2018 but left the club on 19 August along with Gray.

Career statistics

Managerial statistics

Honours
Preston North End
Football League Second Division: 1999–2000

Individual
PFA Team of the Year: 1998–99 Second Division, 1999–2000 Second Division
Oldham Athletic Player of the Year: 2009–10
Oldham Athletic Players' Player of the Year: 2009–10

References

External links

1974 births
Living people
People from Guisborough
Footballers from North Yorkshire
English footballers
Association football defenders
Association football midfielders
Association football utility players
Darlington F.C. players
Preston North End F.C. players
West Bromwich Albion F.C. players
Leeds United F.C. players
Oldham Athletic A.F.C. players
Fleetwood Town F.C. players
Kendal Town F.C. players
English Football League players
Premier League players
National League (English football) players
Northern Premier League players
English football managers
Darlington F.C. managers
Darlington F.C. non-playing staff
York City F.C. non-playing staff